Bulbophyllum sect. Lepidorhiza is a section of the genus Bulbophyllum.

Description
Species in this section have creeping rhizomes with verrucate root and a single inflorescence with one or more flowers

Distribution
Plants from this section are found in Southeast Asia.

Species
Bulbophyllum section Lepidorhiza comprises the following species:

References

Orchid subgenera